Seduced and Abandoned is the debut album by the Scottish duo Hue and Cry. It was released in 1987 and includes the UK Top 10 single "Labour of Love".

Track listing
 "Strength to Strength" - 4:26
 "History City" - 3:24
 "Goodbye to Me" - 4:09
 "Human Touch" - 3:58
 "Labour of Love" - 3:32
 "I Refuse" - 3:32
 "Something Warmer" - 4:06
 "Alligator Man" - 3:58
 "Love Is the Master" - 4:10
 "Just One Word" - 4:04
 "Truth" - 4:46

The LP version of the album excludes the track "Something Warmer".

Personnel
Pat Kane: lead vocals and backing vocals
Greg Kane: synthesizers and electronic piano
Nigel Clark: electric guitar
James Finnigan: bass
Tony McCracken: drums
David Preston: backing vocals
Robert Purse: percussion

References

External links
 Seduced and Abandoned at hueandcry.bandcamp.com

1987 debut albums
Seduced and Abandoned